Janali Akbarov, born Əkbərov Canəli Xanəli oğlu (10 March 1940 – 22 October 2021), was an Azerbaijani khananda folk singer. In 1992, he was awarded the title of the People's Artist of Azerbaijan. He was awarded the Order of Labor in 2020. Janali Akbarov has been awarded for his long-term efficient activity for the sake of development of the Azerbaijani culture.

Life and career 

Akbarov was born on 10 March 1940 in Tukavila village of Lankaran region. He learned mugam from his father and studied music at the Azerbaijan State Music School in Baku.

He studied under Seyid Shushinski and Khan Shushinski. In 1965, Akbarov was a soloist of the State Philharmonic, and in 1976 he was a soloist of the State Opera and Ballet Theater. In 1992, he was awarded the title of the People's Artist of Azerbaijan.

Awards and honors 

 In 2002 he was awarded the Order of Glory.
 In 2020 he was awarded the Order of Labor.
 Shohrat Order
 Sharaf Order
 Labor Order (Azerbaijan)

Discography 
 Janali Akbarov Sings Azerbaijanian Mughams
 Classical Mugham

References

External Links
 

1940 births
2021 deaths
Azerbaijani folk singers
20th-century Azerbaijani singers
People from Lankaran
People's Artists of Azerbaijan
20th-century Azerbaijani male singers
21st-century Azerbaijani singers
21st-century Azerbaijani male singers
Burials at II Alley of Honor